Man from Texas is a 1939 American Western film directed by Albert Herman and starring Tex Ritter, Ruth Rogers and Hal Price.

Plot

Cast
 Tex Ritter as Tex Allen
 Ruth Rogers as Laddie Dennison
 Hal Price as Marshal 'Happy' Jack Martin
 Charles B. Wood as Shooting Kid 
 Kenne Duncan as Speed Dennison 
 Vic Demourelle as Jeff Hall 
 Roy Barcroft as Henchman Drifter
 Frank Wayne as Henchman Longhorn
 Tom London as Henchman Slim
 Chuck Baldra as Deputy
 Walter Wilson as Walt
 Victor Adamson as Dennison Cowhand
 White Flash the horse	as White Flash

References

Bibliography
 Bond, Johnny. The Tex Ritter Story. Chappell Music Company, 1976.

External links
 

1939 films
1939 Western (genre) films
American Western (genre) films
Films directed by Albert Herman
Monogram Pictures films
1930s English-language films
1930s American films